Alfie Joey is a writer, comic, actor, impressionist, singer, presenter, and artist/cartoonist. He hosted the flagship breakfast show on BBC Radio Newcastle from 2009, until his last show  on 28 October 2022.

He was nominated Best Compère at the 2006 Chortle Awards.

On television, Alfie played Vic Reeves’ doctor in the popular sitcom 'Hebburn'. 

Alfie appeared in all seven series of 'Ideal', a BBCsitcom which also starred Johnny Vegas.

Alfie is also one half of the comedy impressionist double act The Mimic Men with Cal Halbert. Their Britain's Got Talent appearance has had over 2.5 million views on YouTube. 

Joey returned to Edinburgh in 2011 with his new one man comedy musical, 'Monopolise' which did a short tour of North East theatres and the Liverpool comedy festival. 
In 2015, at the North east comedy festival, Jesterval, he began performing in a double act, The Mimic Men, alongside Britain's Got Talent impressionist Cal Halbert.

Alfie hosted the flagship breakfast show on BBC Radio Newcastle from 2009, until his last show  on 28 October 2022. His co-hosts included Charlie Charlton and Anna Foster. 

He appeared in the first two series on Mitch Benn's Crimes Against Music on BBC Radio 4 with Robin Ince, first broadcast in 2004 and 2005.

He is a lifelong Sunderland A.F.C. fan. In 2018, Joey appeared in episode 6 of Sunderland 'Til I Die, a Netflix web-series about Sunderland AFC.

References

External links

British comedians
English radio presenters
Living people
People from Peterlee
Musicians from County Durham
1967 births